El Hoyo de Pinares is a municipality located in the province of Ávila, Castile and León, Spain. According to the 2006 census (INE), the municipality had a population of 2,369 inhabitants.

The House of Hoyos, a prominent noble family of Austria-Hungary, in named after this place.

References 

Municipalities in the Province of Ávila